Parris Island most commonly refers to Marine Corps Recruit Depot Parris Island, a United States Marine Corps training facility in South Carolina.

Parris Island may also refer to:

Parris Island, South Carolina
USS Parris Island (AG-72), a United States Navy patrol boat
Parris Island Museum

See also
 Parris (disambiguation)
 Island of Paris